Parliamentary elections were held in the Kingdom of Dalmatia in 1889.

Results
According to one source,the results were:

References

Elections in Croatia
Dalmatia
1889 in Croatia
Elections in Austria-Hungary
History of Dalmatia
Election and referendum articles with incomplete results